Mimmi is a TV series, based on the Viveca Sundvall book series with the same name. It originally aired over Kanal 1 between 21 October-27 November 1988.

Episodes
 Ett steg fram och två tillbaka 
 Hipp, hipp, hurra 
 God Jul lilla gris 
 Henrys bröd! Magens död!
 Apor! Tigrar! och pingviner! 
 Monstret i skåpet

References

1988 Swedish television series debuts
1988 Swedish television series endings
Sveriges Television original programming
Swedish children's television series
Television shows based on children's books